MediaCorp TV TVMobile (Chinese: 流动电视) was a subsidiary of MediaCorp Singapore and was the first channel in the world to pioneer the use of Digital Video Broadcast (DVB) technology to deliver television programmes to commuters. With 89.3 MHz, TVMobile provided the latest infotainment, entertainment programmes and real-time news; keeping travellers informed while travelling.

TVMobile had outdoor-advertising platforms at shopping mall food courts, ferries, academic institutions, taxis and selected SBS Transit buses. Broadcasting from 6:00AM to 12:00 midnight (Singapore/Hong Kong time) daily, TVMobile provided an outdoor-advertising medium that scheduled programming according to viewers’ profile and their travelling patterns. However, it could only be received with a digital set-top box by home viewers.

TV Mobile is discontinued with effect from 1 January 2010.

History
MediaCorp has decided to terminate TVMobile upon expiry of its current agreement with SBS Transit on 1 January 2010.

The company said the discontinuation comes from a careful evaluation of the viability of the service, as resources required to operate and maintain TVMobile are substantial.

Programmes
It featured re-runs and simulcasts of shows both in Mandarin and English from its sister channels and occasionally features original content; for instance, shorts produced in collaboration with Nanyang Polytechnic.

Infrastructure
The network had one main transmitting site, nine filler transmitting sites and two transposers located island-wide. The digital signal was carried via ATM and microwave transmitting medium to the main transmitting site before being re-transmitted to the filler sites.

Receiving the Channel
TV mobile was available on SBS Transit Air-con Buses, Bintan Resort Ferries, the Tasty corner & delight corner in Suntec (Carrefour) and a few SmartCab Taxis. In addition, an audio simulcast of the channel was available by tuning-in to 89.3 MHz on the FM band.

Similar systems in Singapore

Stellar Ace
Stellar Ace, the advertising arm of SMRT Corporation, is responsible for advertising on its trains, buses and taxis. A similar system, through the use of liquid-crystal display (LCD) monitors, has been installed on SMRT's newest fleet of trains (currently suspended as of 2007) and all trains plying the Bukit Panjang LRT.

Moove Media
Moove Media, the advertising arm of ComfortDelGro, is responsible for advertising on its trains, buses and taxis. A similar system, through the use of LCD monitors, has been installed on all trains plying the North East Line, Sengkang LRT & Punggol LRT.

Reception and feedback
As of 2005, TVMobile had been installed in most of SBS Transit's buses. TVMobile was an outdoor digital television station, broadcasting live news and entertainment programmes throughout the buses' operating hours. SBS Transit was the only bus operator to have installed TVMobile in its buses as of 2006.

From time to time, SBS Transit's use of TVMobile had frequently attracted flak in the Straits Times' Forum pages. Some commuters hold the impression that the installation of TVMobile was the reason for increases in bus fares, even after announcements that this was not the cause. There were also feedback about TVMobile's suitability and the repetitiveness of the programs broadcast.

This was despite the fact that the infrastructure and equipment of TVMobile was not managed by SBS Transit at all, but rather, by MediaCorp TV Holdings. SBS Transit buses were just a medium on which TVMobile was installed. TVMobile also provided an extra source of revenue for SBS Transit. This was due to the royalties paid by MediaCorp.

See also
RoadShow is a similar system used in public buses in Hong Kong

References

External links
TVMobile Official Website 
MediaCorp

2001 establishments in Singapore
2010 disestablishments in Singapore
Broadcasting in Singapore
Mediacorp
Television channels and stations established in 2001
Television channels and stations disestablished in 2010
Television networks
Television stations in Singapore